Claman is a surname. Notable people with the surname include:

Dolores Claman (1927–2021), Canadian composer and pianist
Julian Claman (1918–1969), American actor
Liz Claman (born 1963), American television journalist
Matt Claman (born 1959), American politician
Zachary Claman DeMelo (born 1998), Canadian race car driver